Derek Grant may refer to:

 Derek Grant (drummer) (born 1977), drummer for punk band Alkaline Trio
 Derek Grant (ice hockey, born 1974), retired Canadian ice hockey player
 Derek Grant (ice hockey, born 1990), Canadian ice hockey player
 Derick K. Grant, dancer and choreographer
 Derrick Grant (born 1938), rugby player